= Mullahera =

Coordinates: 28°30′N 77°04′E

Mullahera is an Indian village of around 700 homes, lying just at the periphery of Sector 22 Gurgaon near Delhi. Mullahera is one of the very few villages in Haryana to have a gender ratio that is above 1,188 women to 1,000 men.

Now this village comes under MCG. Mullahera's literacy rate is 80%. Current Nigam Parsas Mr Ravinder Yadav. 98% of children go to school and 90% of children achieve 80% marks.
